Gonzalo Benjamin Gutiérrez (born 26 July 2003) is an Argentine professional footballer who plays as a midfielder for San Martín.

Career
Gutiérrez is a product of the San Martín youth system. He was promoted into their senior squad under joint managers Sergio Gómez and Favio Orsi in December 2020, initially appearing on the substitute's bench for a Primera B Nacional win away to Defensores de Belgrano on 6 December. Gutiérrez made his senior debut, aged seventeen, on 13 December against Atlético de Rafaela, after he replaced Facundo Melivilo nine minutes into the second half of a three-goal home defeat.

Career statistics
.

References

External links

2003 births
Living people
Place of birth missing (living people)
Argentine footballers
Association football midfielders
Primera Nacional players
San Martín de Tucumán footballers